Lyelchytsy District or Lieĺčycki Rajon is a district (raion) of Belarus located in the Gomel Region. Its administrative center is Lieĺčycki.

History 
The district was created on 17 July 1924 during early Soviet administrative reforms and frequently changed status in the first three decades of its existence. Originally formed from the Bujnavicki and Lieĺčycki townships (volosts) of the abolished Mazyr Uyezd, the district belonged to the newly established Mazyr Okrug of the Byelorussian Soviet Socialist Republic (BSSR) until 1930, when Mazyr Okrug was dissolved. From 1930 to 1935 the district was a first-order subdivision of the BSSR.

At the time of its creation in 1924, the district had 12 village councils, 147 settlements, 4,913 farms, and 27,664 residents. The village of Lieĺčycki contained 306 farms and 1,659 residents.

In 1935, the Mazyr Okrug was reinstated and Lieĺčycki rejoined. New administrative reforms in 1938 introducing regions (voblasts) dissolved Mazyr Okrug again, created the Polesia Region, and transferred Lieĺčycki to the new region. The town of Lieĺčycki was granted urban-type settlement status in 1938.

During the German occupation of World War II from 1941 to 1944, the district was annexed to the Reichskommissariat Ukraine with its administrative center in Rivne. After the war, the district returned to Polesia Region, to which it remained until 1954, when the present-day Gomel Region was created.

The district was dissolved for several years in the 1960s, being abolished in December 1962 and reinstated in January 1965. It has been a district of Belarus since its independence from the USSR in 1991.

Geography 
The district is heavily forested and wet, with 69.5% forest land cover and 11.1% marsh land cover as of 2010. It is bordered in the north by Zhytkavichy and Pietrykaw districts, in the east by Mazyr and Yel'sk districts, in the west by Stolin District of Brest Region, and in the south by the Zhytomyr and Rivne oblasts of Ukraine. The main river is the Ubort, a tributary of the Pripyat River.

Demographics 
The population of the district was 23,993 as of 2017, with 11,393 living in Lieĺčycki and 12,600 living in rural settlements. The ethnic composition in the 2009 census was 96.8% Belorusian, 1.7% Russian, and 1.1% Ukrainian. The district's population has been in decline since the 1970s, though the urban settlement of Lieĺčycki has grown over the same period.

The district was affected by the 1986 Chernobyl disaster because of its proximity. About 650 people were resettled out of the district from 1986 to 1999 as part of the resulting resettlement program.

Administrative Division 
The district contains twelve rural councils and one urban settlement, containing a total of 73 villages. The rural councils of Hrabianioŭski and Astrazhanski have been abolished since 2009 and their settlements incorporated into the other councils.

References 

 
Districts of Gomel Region